Charles Brun was one of four experimental submarines ordered for the French Navy in 1906. Each boat was built to a different design and Charles Brun was intended to test a novel powerplant. Although the shore-based prototype installation was successful, it was a failure when evaluated aboard the submarine, and the boat was never commissioned for active service. Her hull was stripped of its equipment and was used to test a floating drydock in 1914. During the First World War, the hull was ordered to be converted into a water tank in 1916, but it is not certain if this was actually done before it was sold for scrap in 1920.

Background
The naval architect and engineer Just Lucien Maurice had submitted multiple submarine designs to the Navy's Board of Construction using a unique closed-cycle powerplant of his own design. The board rejected the four proposals that he submitted in 1902, believing them to be too high risk and that their submerged range was inadequate. The Navy Minister, Jean de Lanessan, was intrigued by his concept and ordered that a prototype of his powerplant be built at the Cherbourg Naval Base for testing.

Maurice had designed a steam fire-tube boiler that utilized the boiler's combustion gases to heat a mixture of sodium acetate and potassium in the space between the two concentric fire tubes. When the submarine submerged the mixture would retain heat, continuing to generate steam, until it solidified.

The prototype at Cherbourg was successful enough that Navy Minister Gaston Thomson opened a competition for submarines that were faster on the surface and with longer range than the preceding  on 6 February 1906. Four designs were submitted, including Maurice's for Charles Brun, all of which were authorized by the board.

Description
Her crew numbered 25 officers and sailors. Like most French submarines of this period, Charles Brun was fitted with a prominent "walking deck" above her single hull to facilitate operations on the surface.

The submarine's hull was divided into seven watertight compartments plus the conning tower. The boat had three rudders, two below the waterline and the third above the "walking deck" to improve her submerged maneuverability. She had three sets of diving planes, fore, aft, and amidships, to control her depth below the water. The hull was fitted with a dozen external ballast tanks and three internal tanks, one of which could be used as an auxiliary tank for fuel oil.

Submerged, the steam engines could be supplemented by a pair of  electric motors using electricity from 120 Tudor batteries.

Internally, Charles Brun was armed with two superimposed  torpedo tubes in the bow. Externally, the boat was equipped with two rotating Drzewiecki drop collars below the "walking deck" and two fixed launching frames at the stern aimed to the rear.

Construction, trials and subsequent history
Charles Brun, named for the naval architect and politician Charles Brun who had worked on the first , was ordered on 31 December 1906 from the Toulon Naval Base. She was laid down on 4 April 1908 and was launched on 14 September 1910 and began her trials the following month. Initial testing of her powerplant was plagued by combustion problems that sent a lot of smoke and flames out the funnels, but these were resolved before the submarine began her sea trials on 1 June 1911. These were initially limited to performance on the surface and quickly revealed that the boilers produced only  of steam compared to the prototype's  because Maurice had altered the design of the boilers, reducing the amount of the sodium acetate/potassium mixture by over 20 percent and had changed the spacing of the boiler tubes which concentrated their heat in the center of the mixture rather than distributing it evenly throughout.

The submarine made her deepest dive on 10 October and operation of the powerplant and her habitability underwater was judged acceptable. Even using the electric motors, her underwater endurance could not be extended beyond about three hours because the Maurice boilers worked best when used at a high rate in a relatively short period.

The Navy's Test Commission assessed Charles Brun as unsuitable for active service with the fleet after her trials were concluded in August 1913 and began condemnation proceedings on 20 October after rejecting a proposal to replace the forward boiler with batteries taken from a decommissioned . Beginning in January 1914, her hull was stripped of most of her equipment, her engines were reused in the gunboat , and then ballast was added so it could be used in testing floating drydocks. When the First World War began in August, her conversion into a water tank for the naval base in Bizerte, French Tunisia, was proposed, but could not be performed because of stability issues from the earlier work. A contract was issued to Chantiers et Ateliers de Provence on 1 July 1916 to convert the hull into a water tank at their shipyard in Port de Bouc. The hull was there in September, but the conversion was probably not performed because she was listed as a submarine hull when she was finally struck from the navy list on 7 June 1920. The boat was listed for auction on 13 November, but did not sell. It was sold to M. Saglia for 11,000 francs on 30 December and subsequently scrapped.

See also 
List of submarines of France

References

Bibliography

 

1910 ships
Submarine classes